This was the first edition of the tournament.

Lloyd Glasspool and Harri Heliövaara won the title after defeating Kimmer Coppejans and Sergio Martos Gornés 7–5, 6–1 in the final.

Seeds

Draw

References

External links
 Main draw

Gran Canaria Challenger - Doubles